Powell River is a city on the northern Sunshine Coast of southwestern British Columbia, Canada. Most of its population lives near the eastern shores of Malaspina Strait, which is part of the larger Georgia Strait between Vancouver Island and the Mainland. With two intervening long, steep-sided fjords inhibiting the construction of a contiguous road connection with Vancouver to the south, geographical surroundings explain Powell River's remoteness as a community, despite relative proximity to Vancouver and other populous areas of the BC Coast. The city is the location of the head office of the qathet Regional District.

History

The Powell River was named for Israel Wood Powell, Powell was B.C.'s first superintendent for Indian Affairs and a chief architect of colonial policies including residential schools and the banning of the Potlatch. He was traveling up the coast of BC in the 1880s and the river and lake were named after him. Powell River is named after Israel Wood Powell despite him never stepping foot in the town.
Powell was a supporter of B.C. being part of the union with Canada and brought the first Canadian flag to BC on June 17, 1871.

The pulp mill was started in 1908, with a corresponding townsite company town commenced in 1910: the first roll of paper was produced at Powell River Mill in 1912.  Similarly, large logging companies had earlier moved in to take advantage of the huge timber. Brooks, Scanlon &  Obrien; Bloedel, Stewart and Welch; and Theodosia Logging were but a few logging companies, with the Brooks brothers and M.J. Scanlon forming the Powell River Company, western Canada's first pulp and paper mill. The Historic Townsite was designated a National Historic Site of Canada in 1995, recognizing the exceptionally well preserved early 20th Century planned community, rooted firmly in the Garden City Design Movement and the Arts and Crafts philosophy.

When the British Columbia Credit Unions Act was passed in 1939, a study club organized by local millworkers secured the first charter with a deposit of $48.30.  The mill provided a small office space at very low rent in the early years.  By 1955, when the Powell River Credit Union (now 'First Credit Union') moved into a permanent office, it had over 3,000 members and $1 million in assets.

The mill in Powell River was at one time the largest pulp and paper mill in the world.  In its prime, one in every 25 newspapers in the world was printed on paper from the Powell River mill.  However, since then it has significantly cut back on production and now produces newsprint and specialty papers for Catalyst Paper. The mill is downsizing, and only three paper machines (#9, #10 and #11) remain in production, thus laying off hundreds of employees. The subsequent diversification of the local economy led to an increased focus on ecotourism and the arts, in addition to more traditional resources like mining, fishing, and general forestry.  In recognition of its strong arts and cultural programs, Powell River was named a "Cultural Capital of Canada" in 2004.

The Powell River area is the current home to the Tla A'min Nation of the Mainland Comox branch of the Coast Salish peoples, who still reside there to this day. Their village is commonly referred to as Sliammon (the usual English adaptation of Tla'Amin).

Name change 

In May 2021, Tla'amin Nation submitted a request to Powell River city council requesting a change in the name. The request comes because City namesake Israel Powell, B.C.’s superintendent of Indian affairs from 1872 to 1889, helped to ensure that the sale of Lot 450, land that included tiyskʷat village, went through, as well as overseeing the removal of children from their homes to be sent to residential schools, and the banning of potlatch, language and other Indigenous customs.

Sports teams
Powell River is host to the Powell River Kings, a member team of the British Columbia Hockey League, and Powell River Villa, who play in the Vancouver Island Soccer League. Powell River also has many youth sports teams and associations. PRMHA is the minor hockey associations with house & rep teams. Powell River's gymnastics association has produced many reputable gymnasts.

Powell River's youth baseball league is called the P.R.M.B.A. It consists of six different age groups known as T-Ball, Tadpole, Mosquito, Pee Wee, Bantam, and Midget/Junior.

Attractions 

In 2020, Powell River received a $10,000 grant from the government of British Columbia to support tourism in the town. Nearby Texada Island with quiet beaches and lakes provides tourism opportunities and is a common weekend destination for the cities' residents. Both Texada Island and Powell River are popular for fishing, hunting, sailing, power boating camping and remote hiking.

The Spanish renaissance-style Patricia Theatre is Canada's oldest continuously operating theatre, first built in 1913 and then rebuilt in 1928. Powell River Historical Museum depicts the interactions between the pioneers and First Nations as well as showing the tools and items that would have been used by those groups. The Townsite Heritage Society was formed in 1992 to maintain and promote the historical character of the traditional neighbourhood and business section of the Powell River Townsite.

Powell River hosts a number of festivals that highlight local interest and culture, including the Blackberry Festival, Pacific Region International Summer Music Academy (PRISMA) Festival, Townsite Jazz Festival, International Choral Kathaumixw, and the Sunshine Music Festival.

Powell River is home to the Sunshine Coast Trail, Canada's longest hut-to-hut hiking trail. The free-access 180 kilometre back-country trail meanders through a wide variety of landscapes, including coastal shorelines, old-growth forest, panoramic mountaintops, pristine creeks and lakes and salmon streams.

Transportation

While located on the mainland and not an island by definition, Powell River is a community isolated by ocean and mountains and is only accessible by water (BC Ferries) or by air (Powell River Airport). Powell River is located on Highway 101 but driving the length of the highway requires two ferries before arriving at Horseshoe Bay in West Vancouver. The alternative access to the town is a ferry crossing from Comox on Vancouver Island. Since the Sunshine Coast is similarly isolated from the rest of the BC mainland, vehicles from Vancouver must take two ferries to reach Powell River (across Howe Sound and the Jervis Inlet, if travelling via Sechelt; and across Georgia Strait twice if going via Nanaimo). The surrounding inlets (fjords) banked by mountainous terrain have made land based road connections to other areas of the BC mainland an expensive proposal. One land based route connecting Powell River to Highway 99 near Squamish has been studied, but would require two tunnels (4.5 km and 8.0 km long) and cost around 5 billion dollars. All of the city's roads are two-lane residential roads, and Highway 101 merges with Marine Avenue to form the city's main street.

Powell River has two ferry terminals, both of which belong to BC Ferries. The Westview Ferry Terminal is located near the city's downtown and provides service to Comox and Vancouver Island onboard the Salish Eagle, and to Texada Island on the Island Discovery. The Saltery Bay Ferry Terminal is located 23 km south on Highway 101 and provides access to the Sunshine Coast on the Malaspina Sky via route to Earl's Cove near Skookumchuck Narrows.

Powell River has a small airport with a single 1,200 meter long runway and indoor waiting terminal. It is serviced by Pacific Coastal Airlines, which offers 20- to 25-minute flights between Powell River Airport and the South Terminal of Vancouver's International Airport. Charter flights and private aircraft also make use the runway on a regular basis.

The City of Powell River also has a small network of public transportation bus routes, run by BC Transit with 6 routes.

City of Powell River
The City of Powell River includes the original Townsite, which became designated a National Historic District in 1995, one of only seven in Canada. There is also the more populous Westview, and the Cranberry and Wildwood areas. On October 15, 2005, coinciding with its 50th anniversary of incorporation, Powell River was officially designated a city.

Townsite and Cranberry are connected by three roads by the names of Lombardy Ave, Timberlane Ave, and Hemlock Street.

Demographics

The median household income in 2005 for Powell River was $46,777, which is below the British Columbia provincial average of $52,709.

Ethnicity

Religion 
According to the 2021 census, religious groups in Powell River included:
Irreligion (8,405 persons or 61.6%)
Christianity (4,855 persons or 35.6%)
Hinduism (60 persons or 0.4%)
Buddhism (50 persons or 0.4%)
Sikhism (35 persons or 0.3%)
Judaism (30 persons or 0.2%)
Indigenous Spirituality (25 persons or 0.2%)
Islam (20 persons or 0.1%)

Geography

Climate and ecosystem 
The city has an exceptional Mediterranean climate of the warm-summer type (Köppen: Csb), resulting in the most northerly location in the northern hemisphere, being that in Europe it is 5° further south. Although the hot season is dry, the vegetation reflects its location west of the mid-latitudes and who can describe the climate differently being situated within a temperate rainforest, Coastal Western Hemlock biogeoclimatic zone the mild winters and high humidity (although it has a defined dry season) it owns a wide zone of growth with firs, cedars and conifers. On average, the CWH is the rainiest biogeoclimatic zone in British Columbia. The zone typically has a cool mesothermal climate: cool summers (although hot dry spells can be frequent) and mild winters.

The mean monthly temperature is above  for 4–6 months of the year. Less than 15% of total precipitation occurs as snowfall in the south, but as much as 40-50% in the northern parts of the zone.

Education
A regional campus of Vancouver Island University is located in Powell River. This campus is called tiwšɛmawtxw (tyew-shem-out), which means house of learning. The name was a gift to the institution from the Tla’amin Nation Executive Council to acknowledge VIU's "readiness and willingness to participate and engage in meaningful reconciliation."

The Powell River School Board (School District 47 Powell River) operates eight schools which includes Brooks Secondary School (high school), James Thomson, Henderson, Edgehill, Grief Point (now the location of Powell River Christian School), Kelly Creek, and Texada (elementaries) as well as Westview Learning Centre. In 2013, A brand new $15.6 million Elementary school named Westview Elementary was opened. It is the replacement of the old Grief Point School.

The Conseil scolaire francophone de la Colombie-Britannique operates two Francophone schools: école Côte-du-soleil (primary and junior high school) and école secondaire Brooks.

Private Other elementary schools in the region include Assumption Catholic School (Pre-School, K-9) and Powell River Christian School (Pre-School, K-9).

Power supply
East of Saltery Bay, a powerline crosses Jervis Inlet on a span of 3.1 kilometres (1.9 mi).

See also
 Cortes Island
 Hernando Island
 Savary Island
 Texada Island
 Harwood Island

Notes

References

External links

 
Cities in British Columbia
Heritage sites in British Columbia
National Historic Sites in British Columbia
Populated places on the British Columbia Coast